Gonçalo Mendes Paciência (born 1 August 1994) is a Portuguese professional footballer who plays as a centre-forward for La Liga club Celta.

Formed at Porto, he appeared mainly for the reserves during his spell, playing only 16 competitive games with the first team and also being loaned four times. In 2018, he signed with Bundesliga club Eintracht Frankfurt.

A former youth international for Portugal, Paciência made his senior debut in 2017 and scored his first goal in his second match.

Club career

Porto
Born in Porto, Paciência joined FC Porto's youth system at the age of only 8. He made his senior debut on 12 January 2014, starting for the B team in a 2–0 home win against Portimonense in the Segunda Liga. He scored his first goals in the competition on 22 March, helping to a 2–2 away draw with Feirense.

Paciência first appeared in competitive games with the main squad on 21 January 2015, again acting as starter in a 1–1 draw at Braga in the Taça da Liga. He netted his first goal in the same competition, in a 4–1 home victory over Académica de Coimbra that took place the following week.

On 29 July 2015, Paciência joined Académica in a season-long loan. On 31 August 2016, still owned by Porto, he moved to Olympiacos. His spell at the latter club, which was undermined by heart problems, was concluded in December.

Paciência continued to be loaned the following seasons, to Rio Ave and Vitória de Setúbal. On 25 August 2017, while at the service of the latter club, he scored an own goal in an eventual 1–1 away draw against Belenenses, coached by his father. On 27 January 2018, he netted early in the final of the League Cup and also converted his penalty shootout attempt, in a loss to Sporting CP after a 1–1 draw in regulation time.

Eintracht Frankfurt
On 12 July 2018, deemed surplus to requirements as practically all Portuguese players by manager Sérgio Conceição, Paciência signed a four-year contract with German club Eintracht Frankfurt. He made his debut on 18 August in the first round of the DFB-Pokal, in which he came on as a late substitute and scored a consolation in a 2–1 defeat for the holders at Regionalliga team SSV Ulm, but a month later he suffered a knee injury in training. He returned for his Bundesliga debut the following 17 February, as a last-minute replacement for Sébastien Haller in a 1–1 home draw with Borussia Mönchengladbach; he finished the season with three goals, beginning with the added-time winner against Hoffenheim at the Waldstadion on his first start.

Paciência scored seven league goals in 2019–20 campaign for the ninth-placed side (ten in all competitions), including two on 18 October in a 3–0 home win over Bayer Leverkusen. He played regularly under manager Adi Hütter alongside compatriot André Silva and Dutchman Bas Dost, making up for the sales of Haller, Luka Jović and Ante Rebić; on 25 January he signed a new contract until 2023.

On 15 September 2020, Paciência joined Schalke 04 on a year-long loan with an option to make the move permanent. His maiden league appearance took place three days later, when he started in the 8–0 away loss to Bayern Munich; on 18 October he scored his only goal for the eventually relegated team to gain a home draw against Union Berlin, their first point in the eighth game of the season. From November to April, he was sidelined with another knee injury.

Paciência scored twice in Eintracht's run to the 2022 UEFA Europa League Final, earning a win and a draw against Royal Antwerp. He was unused for the decisive match at the Ramón Sánchez Pizjuán Stadium, a penalty shootout defeat of Rangers.

Celta
On 6 August 2022, Paciência moved to Spain after agreeing to a three-year deal at Celta. He scored on his La Liga debut a week later, in a 2–2 home draw with Espanyol. He did not hold down a regular place in the team during his first season, particularly after the arrival of compatriot Carlos Carvalhal as manager, and his minutes dried up further after the signing of Haris Seferovic in January.

International career
Paciência earned 57 caps for Portugal at youth level, scoring 21 goals. His first game for the under-21 team was on 5 March 2014 at the age of 19, when he started and missed a second-half penalty in a 2–0 home win over North Macedonia in the 2015 UEFA European Championship qualifiers. Selected for the finals in the Czech Republic, he collected three substitute appearances for the runners-up, scoring in the 1–1 group stage draw with Sweden and converting his shootout attempt in the final against the same opponent.

Paciência was part of the squad at the 2016 Summer Olympics, netting three times in the group phase in an eventual quarter-final exit. He first appeared with the full side on 14 November 2017, coming on as a 46th-minute substitute for Gelson Martins in a 1–1 friendly draw against the United States. In his second match, exactly two years later, he played the entire 6–0 rout of Lithuania in the Algarve in the UEFA Euro 2020 qualifying stage, scoring the fourth goal.

Personal life
Paciência's father, Domingos, was also a footballer and a forward. He too was groomed at Porto.

Career statistics

Club

International

Scores and results list Portugal's goal tally first, score column indicates score after each Paciência goal.

Honours
Olympiacos
Super League Greece: 2016–17

Porto
Primeira Liga: 2017–18

Eintracht Frankfurt
UEFA Europa League: 2021–22

Individual
SJPF Segunda Liga Player of the Month: February 2015
SJPF Segunda Liga Young Player of the Month: March 2014

See also
List of association football families

References

External links

Portuguese League profile 

1994 births
Living people
Portuguese footballers
Footballers from Porto
Association football forwards
Primeira Liga players
Liga Portugal 2 players
Padroense F.C. players
FC Porto B players
FC Porto players
Associação Académica de Coimbra – O.A.F. players
Rio Ave F.C. players
Vitória F.C. players
Super League Greece players
Olympiacos F.C. players
Bundesliga players
Eintracht Frankfurt players
FC Schalke 04 players
La Liga players
RC Celta de Vigo players
UEFA Europa League winning players
Portugal youth international footballers
Portugal under-21 international footballers
Portugal international footballers
Footballers at the 2016 Summer Olympics
Olympic footballers of Portugal
Portuguese expatriate footballers
Expatriate footballers in Greece
Expatriate footballers in Germany
Expatriate footballers in Spain
Portuguese expatriate sportspeople in Greece
Portuguese expatriate sportspeople in Germany
Portuguese expatriate sportspeople in Spain